The CAFA U-20 Women's  Championship is a biennial football championship for women's  footballers under the age of 20 and is organized by the Central Asian Football Association (CAFA). The championship was held for the first time in June 2021 in Tajikistan.

Results

References

Association football governing bodies in Asia
2021 in women's association football